Manuel Rodrigues Tavares de Almeida Neto (born 11 December 1993) is a Brazilian dressage rider. He competed at the 2014 World Equestrian Games in Normandy where she finished 24th with the Brazilian team in the team competition and 87th in the individual dressage competition.

His twin brother Pedro and sister Luiza have also been competing internationally for Brazil in dressage.

References

1993 births
Living people
Brazilian male equestrians
Brazilian dressage riders
Place of birth missing (living people)